The Cabinet of Victor de Broglie was announced on 12 March 1835 by King Louis Philippe I.
It replaced the Cabinet of Édouard Adolphe Mortier.  

On 14 January 1836 the Minister of Finance, Georges Humann, presented the draft budget for 1837 to the Chamber of Deputies. This included a proposal for conversion of debt that had not been discussed with his cabinet colleagues. The proposal caused an unexpected storm of controversy, and Humann was forced to resign on 18 January 1836. The issue led to a public debate, followed by the collective resignation of the cabinet.
The cabinet was replaced on 22 February 1836 by the First cabinet of Adolphe Thiers.

Ministers

The cabinet was created by ordinance of 12 March 1835. The ministers were:
 President of the Council: Victor de Broglie
 Foreign Affairs: Victor de Broglie
 Interior: Adolphe Thiers; Sub-Secretary of State Adrien de Gasparin from 4 April 1835
 Justice: Jean-Charles Persil
 War: 
 Henri de Rigny (interim) until 30 April 1835
 Nicolas Joseph Maison from 30 April 1835
 Finance
 Georges Humann until 18 January 1836
 Antoine Maurice Apollinaire d'Argout from 18 January 1836
Navy and Colonies: Guy-Victor Duperré
Public Education: François Guizot
Commerce: Tanneguy Duchâtel

References

Sources

French governments
1835 establishments in France
1836 disestablishments in France
Cabinets established in 1835
Cabinets disestablished in 1836